Crawley railway station served the village of Crawleyside, County Durham, England, from 1845 to 1846 on the Stanhope and Tyne Railway.

History 
The station was opened on 1 September 1845 by the Stanhope and Tyne Railway. It closed on 31 October of the same year but reopened on 1 April 1846, only to close again on 31 December 1846.

References 

Disused railway stations in County Durham
Railway stations in Great Britain opened in 1845
Railway stations in Great Britain closed in 1846
1845 establishments in England
1846 disestablishments in England